Arefu is a commune in Argeș County, Muntenia, Romania. It is composed of three villages: Arefu, Căpățânenii Pământeni (the commune center) and Căpățânenii Ungureni.

In Popular Culture
  In the game Fallout 3, a settlement in the Capital Wasteland shares its name with Arefu, and is involved in a quest involving faux-vampirism, in reference to the real Arefu's proximity to the castle of Vlad Tepes III.

References

Communes in Argeș County
Localities in Muntenia